Rawa may refer to:

Places

Poland
Rawa Mazowiecka, a town
Rawa (river)
Rawa County
Rawa, Lublin Voivodeship, a village

Other places
Rawa, India
Rawa, Iraq, a town in Iraq
Rawa Aopa Watumohai National Park, on the Indonesian island of Sulawesi
Rawa Island, in Malaysia
Rava-Ruska, Ukraine

Other
Revolutionary Association of the Women of Afghanistan
Rawa (tribe), an indigenous community in West Malaysia
Rawa, Ravva or Bombay rava, broken rice
Recovering America's Wildlife Act, proposed American law

People
Rawa (Mossi), founder of the Mossi kingdom of Yatenga
Richard A. Watson (born 1971), programmer and game designer for the Myst series of computer games

See also
Battle of Rawa, a World War I battle
Rawa Blues Festival, at Spodek, Poland